INS Kabra is a naval vessel named after an island of the Andaman and Nicobar archipelago. It belongs to the  Car Nicobar class of high-speed offshore patrol vessels are built by Garden Reach Shipbuilders and Engineers (GRSE) for the Indian Navy. Kabra was eighth in a series of 10 Fast Attack Crafts.  The vessels are designed as a cost-effective platform for patrol, anti-piracy and rescue operations in India's Exclusive Economic Zone.

The class and its vessels are named for Indian islands. They are the first water jet propelled vessels of the Indian Navy.

History
INS Kabra was commissioned by Vice-Admiral K.N. Sushil, Flag Officer Commanding-in-Chief of the Southern Naval Command, at the Kochi naval base on 8 June 2011.

Design
The Car Nicobar class vessels were designed and built by GRSE. Production of the class was fast-tracked after the 2008 Mumbai attacks. The vessels feature improved habitability with fully air-conditioned modular accommodation, on board reverse osmosis plant for desalination, and a sewage treatment plant.

The vessels are each powered by three HamiltonJet HM811 water jets, coupled with MTU 16V 4000 M90 engines, delivering a combined 8160 KW of power. An aluminium superstructure reduces weight and is designed to reduce radar cross-section.

As patrol vessels, they are lightly armed. They carry various sensors, including the Furuno navigation radar and sonar. Armament on board includes a 30mm CRN-91 automatic cannon with an electronic day-night fire control system of Ordnance Factory Board (OFB) and Bharat Electronics Limited (BEL) origin. The vessels also mount two 12.7mm heavy machine guns (HMG) and multiple medium machine guns, besides carrying shoulder-launched Igla surface-to-air missiles to combat aerial threats.

References

External links
Car Nicobar Class - Bharat Rakshak
New age ship for patrol

Media

Video
Indian Navy adds new warships

Images
Commissioning ceremony of INS Kora Divh and INS Cheriyam
Governor taking salute during commissioning ceremony
INS Car Nicobar during commissioning ceremony
INS Chetlat during commissioning ceremony

Car Nicobar-class patrol vessels
2010 ships